Clinging to a Scheme is the third studio album by Swedish indie pop band The Radio Dept. It was released on 19 April 2010 by Labrador Records.

Critical reception

In 2018, Pitchfork listed Clinging to a Scheme at number 24 on its list of the 30 best dream pop albums.

Track listing

Personnel
Credits for Clinging to a Scheme adapted from album liner notes.

The Radio Dept.
Johan Duncanson
Martin Carlberg
Daniel Tjäder

Additional musicians
Per Blomgren – drums (track 10)
Mikael Häggström – live drums (track 3)
Mattias Oldén – saxophone (track 2)

Production
Johan Duncanson – production
Martin Carlberg – production
Johannes Berglund – mastering (track 4)
Mattias Oldén – mastering (tracks 1, 3, 5–10)
The Radio Dept. – mastering (track 2)

Artwork and design
Johan Duncanson – sleeve design

Charts

References

2010 albums
The Radio Dept. albums
Labrador Records albums